Like most major cities, Montreal needs easy highway access from its suburbs and surrounding areas. However, because Montreal was built on an island surrounded by three rivers, it can be entered by land only on a bridge or through a tunnel. Although the city was founded in 1642, it was not until 1847 that the first fixed link to the outside was established when a wooden bridge was built across Rivière des Prairies to Île Jésus, on the site of what is now Ahuntsic Bridge. Another bridge was built immediately afterward, a few kilometers (miles) west, which became Lachapelle Bridge, and another in 1849, Pont des Saints-Anges, to the east. The latter bridge collapsed in the 1880s and was never rebuilt.

With the advent of the railroad, Montreal got a fixed link to the mainland; in 1854 railroad bridges were built in Sainte-Anne-de-Bellevue, across both channels of the Ottawa River, linking Montreal Island to Ontario and the Vaudreuil-Soulanges peninsula through Perrot Island. In 1860, Montreal got its first link to the South Shore with the construction of Victoria Bridge, which was, at the time of its opening, the longest bridge in the world. Indirect links to the North Shore also had to wait for railroad construction, but this took longer; the Canadian Pacific Railway opened its link to Saint-Jérôme in 1876, through Île Jésus.

Crossings
This list of bridges and other fixed links serving the Island of Montreal proceeds counter-clockwise around the island from southwest, at the exit of Lake Saint-Louis, downstream along the St. Lawrence River, then upstream along Rivière des Prairies all the way to Lake of Two Mountains, then downstream again along the East Channel of the Ottawa River until it reaches Lake Saint-Louis. The year of construction is that of the structure currently in place, accompanied by the year of construction of the original structure if the current one replaced an older span.

Spanning the Saint Lawrence River and Saint Lawrence Seaway 
The crossing of the Saint Lawrence River has always proved problematic for engineers due to width, depth, currents, and ice cover. Not to be outdone by its rival, however, the Canadian Pacific Railway built its own span, the Saint-Laurent Railway Bridge, upstream from the Lachine Rapids in 1886
for which the Mohawks of Kahnawake were hired to erect the steel superstructure. Although Victoria Bridge was also used as a road crossing since 1898, it was not before the 1930s that two fully dedicated road bridges, Jacques-Cartier and Mercier, were built. More spans, including Louis-Hippolyte Lafontaine Bridge–Tunnel and Champlain Bridge, were built in the 1960s. No new span was built for over 50 years, until a replacement Champlain Bridge was constructed at the cost of several billion dollars. It opened in 2019, while the previous span was closed to traffic to be demolished.

The construction of the Saint Lawrence Seaway in the 1950s required extensive modifications for all spans that existed at the time. Those are not reflected in the table below.

Spanning the Rivière des Prairies 
Although the Rivière des Prairies is much smaller than the Saint Lawrence, bridge construction there did not begin until the 1840s—when rapid construction began on three wooden toll bridges to what is now Laval, one of which, Pont des Saints-Anges, collapsed in the 1880s and was never rebuilt. The existence of regular ferry services across the river is attested from 1813, but these ferries were discontinued when the bridges opened. The first railroad across the river was opened in 1876, and the Bordeaux Railway Bridge is the oldest fixed link to Laval that is still standing. (Another bridge across Rivière des Mille Îles, which was part of the same line, collapsed in 1882 but was immediately rebuilt.) The highway construction boom of the 1960s and 1970s led to the construction of four new freeway bridges across the river, and the upgrading of the existing Pie IX Bridge to freeway standards.

Spanning the Lake of Two Mountains and the Ottawa River East Channel 
The first railway bridge to Montreal Island was the Grand Trunk Railway bridge across the Ottawa River East Channel. Along with another bridge built simultaneously across the West Channel, this bridge provided the first fixed link from Montreal to the mainland. It was not until 1925, however, that a fixed road link, formed by Galipeault Bridge and Taschereau Bridge, was built across the Ottawa River from Montreal Island. Île Perrot was the only way out of Montreal to the West before the construction of Île aux Tourtes Bridge, which goes directly to Vaudreuil across the Lake of Two Mountains.

All three spans across the Ottawa River East Channel are twinned by another span, built simultaneously, across the West Channel.

See also

 Crossings of the Canal de l'Aqueduc
 Crossings of the Lachine Canal
 List of crossings of the Ottawa River
 List of crossings of the Rivière des Mille Îles
 Rivière des Prairies
 List of crossings of the Rivière des Prairies
 List of crossings of the Saint Lawrence River
 List of hydroelectric stations
 List of bridges in Canada

Notes
The section of Honoré-Mercier bridge spanning over the St. Lawrence Seaway was rebuilt to seaway standards in the 1950s. The bridge was twinned by an identical one, on the downriver side, which opened in 1963.

The Champlain Bridge Ice Structure, known in French as "l'Estacade Champlain," was built to control ice floes coming from the Laprairie Basin.

At the north end of Champlain Bridge, two spans, one north-south (aut. 15 and 20) and one east-west (aut. 10) connect Île des Sœurs to I. of Montreal. These two spans, called Pont Île-des-Sœurs and Pont Clément, are part of the Champlain Bridge complex.

Victoria Bridge was built as a one-track tubular bridge which opened in 1860. It was the first bridge to cross the St. Lawrence River, and the longest bridge in the world. It was rebuilt as a two-track truss bridge in 1898. The South Y approach was rebuilt around the Saint-Lambert locks of the St. Lawrence Seaway in 1961.

Pont de la Concorde (Concorde Bridge) and Pont des Îles ("Bridge of the Islands") were built for Expo 67. Pont de la Concorde connects Montreal Island to Saint Helen's Island, while Pont des Îles connects Saint Helen's Island to Notre-Dame Island.

Jacques-Cartier Bridge was originally named Harbour Bridge/Pont du Havre, and renamed after Jacques Cartier in 1934 (400th anniversary of Cartier's first voyage). The section over the St. Lawrence Seaway was lifted to a new height in 1962.

The Louis-Hippolyte Lafontaine complex consists of a tunnel from Montreal to Île Charron and a bridge from Île Charron to the South Shore.

Construction of the Highway 25 Bridge started in early 2008 and was finished in May 2011. It is a toll bridge.

The Rivière des Prairies hydro complex is a set of three dams: one from Montreal I. to Île de la Visitation (west of the Papineau-Leblanc Bridge), which includes a footpath; another between Île de la Visitation and Île du Cheval de Terre; and the longest span between Île du Cheval-de-Terre and Île Jésus. Île de la Visitation is joined to Montreal by another two small bridges: a road bridge, which also serves as a dam (historically, a water mill) and a footbridge.

The railway crossing at Île Bigras consists of two spans, one north and one south of Île Bigras.

A structure known as "Île Bray Bridge" was abandoned while still under construction in favor of Île aux Tourtes Bridge.

Galipeault Bridge was first built in 1925 and doubled in 1964. Both spans have been replaced since. Taschereau Bridge, which was part of the same project, spans the West Channel along the same highway.

References 

Montreal
Bridges